Chika a given name or a nickname. It can be an Igbo given name or Japanese given name. It may be neither. Non-Igbo and Non-Japanese people using the name, include the following:

Given name
 Chika Emeagi (born 1979), Australian women's basketball player
 Sriranga Chika Raya or Sriranga II (died 1614), Indian monarch

Nickname
 Chika (footballer), born Celso Cardoso de Moraes, (born 1979), Brazilian defender
 Sisca Chika Jessica (born 1988), Indonesian actress

See also

 Chia (surname)
 Chaika (surname)
 Chiba (surname)
 Chica (name)
 Chicka (disambiguation)
 Chida (surname)
 Chika (disambiguation)
 Chika (Igbo given name)
 Chika (Japanese given name)
 Chiki